The Canadian Fairmile B was a motor launch built during the Second World War for the Royal Canadian Navy. They were adaptations of the British Fairmile B motor launch design incorporating slight modifications for Canadian climatic and operational conditions. Eighty-eight were built in Canada for service with the Coastal Forces of the Royal Canadian Navy in home waters, of which eight were supplied to the United States Navy.

They were known by their crews as "The Little Ships", "Little Fighting Ships", "Q-Boats", "MLs" or "Holy Rollers" (due to their violent pitching and tossing),

History 
In the spring of 1940 Canada's Naval Staff realized that the Royal Canadian Navy (RCN) needed more vessels equipped with ASDIC sets for anti-submarine patrols in the St. Lawrence River and Pacific Coast. Learning "that the Admiralty was planning to build Type "B" Fairmile motor launches for such work in British waters", the RCN began to investigate the comparative advantages of building and employing the Fairmile B motor launch (ML) in Canadian waters. By the end of 1940 with the first British Fairmile B motor launches completed, performance figures and a complete set of drawings and specifications were sent to Canada. Although unimpressed with the trial results that showed that the Fairmile B was not quite maneuverable at slow speeds required for the ASDIC to work correctly, the need for more anti-submarine vessels was so great that the Naval Staff proceeded with the program.

By April 1941, contracts for the first twenty-four Fairmile B boats was signed with seven builders in Ontario, three in British Columbia, and one in Nova Scotia for a "standard price for each vessel of $85,000 in the east and $76,000 in British Columbia." Expected that the twenty-four boats would be delivered by the end of 1941, shortages of resources and components delayed builders efforts. As such, only thirteen Fairmiles built in the Great Lakes region were delivered in 1941, with only nine successfully arriving in Halifax, Nova Scotia, and four laid up at Sarnia and Toronto, Ontario, due to winter storms. Once in Halifax, only four of the Fairmiles could be kept operational due to a general shortage of naval personnel and all other available crews being prioritized to corvettes and minesweepers.

In July 1941 the Naval Staff let out another contract for twelve MLs in order to help provide for the defence of Newfoundland and adjacent waters. Intended for anti-submarine patrols at St. John's, Botwood, and at Red Bay on the Strait of Belle Isle, continuing material shortages delayed the commissioning of these vessels to May and June 1942.

Design 
Originally designated and painted up as CML (coastal motor launch) 01–36, the Canadian Fairmile B was built of double mahogany wood with an  oak keel. Based on a line of destroyer hulls, they arrived in prefabricated kits, ready to be assembled for the RCN by a number of different boatyards. In contrast to the British built boats, the Canadian Fairmile was narrower, had a greater draught, and were slightly more powerful giving the Canadian boats a  speed advantage over the British boats. As one former Fairmile Captain described them, "sheathed for operation in ice and displacing 100 tons, they were indeed veritable Little Fighting Ships." Crewed by two or three officers and 14 sailors, accommodation on the Fairmile B was thought to be "cramped but comfortable".

Propulsion 

Armament 
A unique design feature of the Fairmile B was that with forty-eight hours notice each boat could be reconfigured to serve in a different role. Fitted with steel strips and tapped holes to ease equipment swaps, weapons and specialist gear such as torpedo tubes, mines, depth charges, and guns could be quickly stripped and attached to the boat. In two days, a Fairmile could have its weapons and equipment reconfigured to serve as an escort, minesweeper, minelayer, navigation leader, coastal raider, patrol boat, ambulance or rescue launch. Small arms for the crew were a 9 mm Sten gun, two .303 rifles, and three .45 revolvers

Each boat was equipped with sonar, radar and wireless telegraphy.

Fairmile flotillas 

During the Second World War the Canadian Fairmile B of the RCN played a vital role escorting shipping along the St. Lawrence River, in the Gulf of St. Lawrence, and between Newfoundland and the mainland of Canada. Regularly deployed in flotillas of six "The Little Ships" relieved larger escort craft urgently needed elsewhere by carrying out anti-submarine patrols, port defence and rescue duties. Based out of shore establishments on the St. Lawrence River, Halifax, Saint John, Shelburne, Sydney and on the West Coast; at sea the RCN Fairmile Fleets were accompanied by two "mother ships"  and  providing fresh water, fuel and medical services.

Vessels in class

Canadian Fairmile Bs in foreign service

French Free Forces Fairmiles 
In February 1943, ML Q052, Q062 and Q063 were transferred to the Free French Forces and stationed at St. Pierre and Miquelon under the command of Flag Officer, Newfoundland. After the war, the French Fairmiles were returned to the RCN.

United States 
Eight Canadian Fairmiles (Q392 through Q399) were built by Le Blanc for the Royal Navy (RN) and were transferred under Lend-Lease to the United States Navy (USN) as US coastal protection had been depleted by transferring ships to the RN for convoy work. The USN used the Canadian-built Fairmiles as submarine chasers giving them the hull codes SC-1466 to SC-1473.

Surviving examples

References

External links 

 Fairmile Motor Launch at Juno Beach Centre "Canada In WWII" junobeach.org
 Canadian Fairmile Q105 presently under restoration
 The Fairmiles, Canada's Little Ships by Spud Roscoe
 Little ships
 Fairmile Radio Fit by Jerry Proc
 Canada's Little Ships by Spud Roscoe

Fairmile B motor launch (Canada)
Fairmile B motor launch (Canada)
Fairmile B motor launch (Canada)
Fairmile B motor launch (Canada)
Fairmile B motor launch (Canada)